Kim Hong-bin (7 October 1964 – disappeared 19 July 2021) was a South Korean mountain climber and skier.

In 1991, he lost all of his fingers while climbing Mount Denali.

On 18 July 2021 he ascended the Broad Peak summit (8,051m), and he became the first disabled person to climb all of the world's 14 mountains over 8,000 meters. However, he fell into a crevasse on the way down from the Broad Peak summit, and is presumed dead.

Mountains climbed

References

External links 

1960s births
2021 deaths
South Korean mountain climbers
Summiters of all 14 eight-thousanders
Mountaineering deaths
Paralympic alpine skiers of South Korea